Mount Colin is a  mountain summit located in Jasper National Park in Alberta, Canada. It is located in the Colin Range, which is a sub-range of the Canadian Rockies. Its nearest higher peak is Sirdar Mountain,  to the southeast. Mount Colin was named in 1859 by James Hector after Colin Fraser of the Hudson's Bay Company in charge of Jasper House from 1835 to 1849, and Sir George Simpson's personal servant. The mountain's name was officially adopted in 1956 by the Geographical Names Board of Canada. 


Climate

Based on the Köppen climate classification, Mount Colin is located in a subarctic climate zone with cold, snowy winters, and mild summers. Winter temperatures can drop below -20 °C with wind chill factors below -30 °C. In terms of favorable weather, June through September are the best months to climb. Precipitation runoff from Mount Colin flows into the Athabasca River.

See also
 
 Geography of Alberta

References

Gallery

External links
 Parks Canada web site: Jasper National Park

Two-thousanders of Alberta
Canadian Rockies
Mountains of Jasper National Park